Cyrus A. Ansary (born 1934) is an American lawyer and philanthropist.

Cyrus A. Ansary is a lawyer, financier, educator, philanthropist and author. He earned a BS in Economics from American University, a law degree from Columbia University, and a Certificate in French Civilization from the University of Paris. He served in the U.S. Marine Corps and now lives with his wife, Jan, in the Washington, D.C., area. They are the parents of four children.

Mr. Ansary was Chairman of the Board of JP Morgan Value Opportunities Fund, Inc. He was the lead director and then chairman of Washington Mutual Investors Fund for a total of 27 years. He also served on the boards of First American Bank of Maryland, Krupp GmbH, and Deutsche Babcock. He is the founder and chairman emeritus of Fort Knox National Company. He managed the first sovereign wealth fund in the world to make transnational equity investments.

Mr. Ansary has been actively engaged in civic endeavors throughout his career. He served on the Board of Trustees of American University in Washington, D.C., for almost 28 years, including the last nine as Chairman of the Board, and is now Chairman Emeritus. He was a member of the board of trustees of the Krupp Foundation in Essen, Germany. He was also an adjunct professor of corporate finance at American University. Since 1990, the Cyrus A. Ansary Medal has been awarded annually to a civic or corporate leader selected by the American University Board of Trustees.

Mr. Ansary has served as a member of the Woodrow Wilson Center for Scholars in Washington, D.C., a trustee of the Washington Opera Society, and a director of the Wolf Trap Foundation in Vienna, Virginia. He was a member of the Life Guard Society of George Washington’s Mount Vernon, and is now an emeritus member.

Mr. Ansary has been listed in Who’s Who in America and also Who’s Who in the World for several decades.

Mr. Ansary has been a long-term student and admirer of President George Washington and in early 2019 published George Washington: Dealmaker-In-Chief. His extensive and carefully researched book on George Washington tells the story of how the Father of Our Country unleashed the entrepreneurial spirit in America. Mr. Ansary is also the author of the memoir Odyssey of High Hopes, published in 2023.

Early life and education 
Ansary, an Iranian American, was born in Tehran, Iran and is the brother of Hushang Ansary. He visited Mt. Vernon, New York in 1950 while attending Alborz High School. Ansary later earned a BS in Economics from American University, a law degree from Columbia and a Certificate in French Civilization from the University of Paris. He served in the U.S. Marines.

Career
Ansary is president of Investment Services International Co. and the founder and current chairman of Fort Knox National Company. He practiced law in the firm of Ansary, Kirkpatrick & Rosse and was chairman of the board of JPMorgan Value Opportunities Fund, Inc. He was affiliated with Washington Mutual Investors Fund, Inc. from 1983 and served on the boards of First American Bank of Maryland, Krupp GmbH, Deutsche Babcock and Wilcox.

Ansary serves as chairman emeritus of American University and was board chair from 1981 to 1989. He is a member of the Woodrow Wilson Council for Scholars and the Life Guard Society of Mount Vernon.

Awards in Ansary name
Since 1990, the Cyrus Ansary Medal has been awarded annually and is one of the highest volunteer awards given by American University. Recipients include alums, "trustees, volunteers, and community leaders who set high standards for achievement and serve as role models to American University's students and alumni". Recent recipients include J. Willard Marriott Jr., Alan L. Meltzer,
Kermit A. Washington  and Hani M. S. Farsi.

In March 2014, Mount Vernon awarded its first Cyrus A. Ansary Prize for Courage and Character to former president George H. W. Bush. The prize was established in 2012 by Cyrus A. and Janet H. Ansary and, in 2014, came with $75,000 in unrestricted and Mt. Vernon-related monies.

Books
 Ansary, Cyrus A. George Washington, Dealmaker-in-Chief: The Story of How the Father of Our Country Unleashed the Entrepreneurial Spirit in America. Washington, DC: Cyrus A. Ansary, 2019. .
 Ansary, Cyrus A.  Odyssey of High Hopes: An Immigrant’s Tale Of Sacrifice, Courage, and Love. Bethesda, MD: Lambert Publications LLC, 2022. .

Personal life
Ansary is brother to Hushang Ansary and uncle to Nina Ansary.

References

American University alumni
Columbia Law School alumni
American lawyers
Living people
Iranian emigrants to the United States
20th-century American businesspeople
University of Paris alumni
People from Tehran
Iranian expatriates in France
United States Marines
1934 births